The Rajiv Gandhi Memorial is a memorial to the former Indian prime minister Rajiv Gandhi at the site where he was assassinated at Sriperumbudur, Chennai, Tamil Nadu India.
Location

Designed by K T Ravindran, it was built by the Central Public Works Department and was opened up in 2003 by Gandhi's widow Sonia Gandhi and former President of India APJ Abdul Kalam.

Gallery

References 

Monuments and memorials in Tamil Nadu
Buildings and structures in Kanchipuram district
Memorials to Rajiv Gandhi
Assassination of Rajiv Gandhi
2003 establishments in Tamil Nadu
Assassination sites